Wild Beast is a 1991 novel by Wang Shuo.

It tells the story of Ma Xiaojun, a son of a military official who roams around Beijing during one summer. He falls in love with a young woman named Mi Lan.

Adaptations
The 1994 film version, titled In the Heat of the Sun, was directed by Wen Jiang.

Chinese artist Song Yang  adopted the novel as Wild Animals, a graphic novel. Yen Press published the English version of the graphic novel.

References

1991 Chinese novels
Chinese novels adapted into films
Novels set in China
Yen Press titles